Magdoceras is a genus of Late/Upper Silurian tarphycerids, a kind of nautiloid cephalopod with a coiled shell.

References

 Magdoceras Fossilworks entry.
 Jack Sepkoski 2002 List of cephalopod genera

Prehistoric nautiloid genera
Silurian cephalopods